Carl Glimm is an American politician serving as a member of Montana Senate from the 2nd district. He was previously a member of the Montana House of Representatives for the 6th district from 2013 to 2021.

Early life and education 
Glimm was born in Conrad, Montana. In 1997, Glimm earned a Bachelor of Science degree in construction engineering technology from Montana State University.

Career 
Glimm is a general contractor. On November 6, 2012, Glimm won the election and became a Republican member of Montana House of Representatives for District 6, defeating Brenda Talbert with 66.87% of the votes. He was re-elected in 2014, 2016, and 2018.

Personal life 
Glimm and his wife, Amy, have two children. Glimm and his family live in Kila, Montana.

See also 
 Montana House of Representatives, District 6

References

External links 
 Carl Glimm at ballotpedia.org
 Carl Glimm at ourcampaigns.com

Living people
Republican Party members of the Montana House of Representatives
Montana State University alumni
People from Conrad, Montana
People from Flathead County, Montana
Year of birth missing (living people)
21st-century American politicians